Spain at the European Athletics Championships has participated in all editions of the European Athletics Championships since the 1950 edition.

These are the results of the Spanish athletes at the European Athletics Championships

Medal count

List of medalists
Men

Women

Multiple medalists

Medals by event

See also
Royal Spanish Athletics Federation

References

External links
 European Athletic Association

 
Nations at the European Athletics Championships
Athletics in Spain